The 22nd Japan Record Awards ceremony was held on 31 December 1980 at the Imperial Theatre, Tokyo, and was broadcast live in Japan through the Tokyo Broadcasting System Television network. The broadcast ran from 19:00 (JST) to 20:55 (JST).

The 22nd Japan Record Award went to Aki Yashiro for "Ame no Bojō" (ja), and Best Vocal Performance went to Harumi Miyako for "Ōsaka Shigure" (ja).

Presenters
 Main host
 Keizō Takahashi

 Progress announcers
 Kentaro Watanabe (TBS announcer)
 Yoshiko Nakada

Nominees and winners

Japan Record Award
 "Ame no Bojō" (ja)
 Artist: Aki Yashiro
 Lyricist: Yū Aku
 Composer: Keisuke Hama
 Arranger: Koji Ryuzaki

Best Vocal Performance Award
 Harumi Miyako – "Ōsaka Shigure"

Best New Artist Award
 Toshihiko Tahara – "Hattoshite! Good" (ja)

New Artist Award
Best New Artist Award nominations.
 Yoshimi Iwasaki – "Anata Iro no Manon"  (ja)
 Naoko Kawai – "Yankee Boy"  (ja)
 Toshihiko Tahara – "Hattoshite! Good" (ja)
 Seiko Matsuda – "Aoi Sangoshō" (ja)
 Kazuko Matsumura – "Kaettekoi yo" (ja)

Special General Public Award
 Momoe Yamaguchi

Best Song Award
Japan Record Award nominations.
 Aki Yashiro – "Ame no Bojō" (ja)
 Sachiko Kobayashi – "Are kara Ichinen Tachimashita"
 Harumi Miyako – "Ōsaka Shigure" (ja)
 Hiromi Iwasaki – "Ginga Densetsu" (ja)
 Mayumi Itsuwa – "Koibito yo" (ja)
 Kenji Sawada – "Sakaba de Dabada" (ja)
 Hideki Saijo – "Santa Maria no Inori" (ja)
 Monta & Brothers – "Dancing All Night" (ja)
 Hiroshi Itsuki – "Futari no Yoake" (ja)
 Mizue Takada – "Watashi no Piano" (ja)

Best Album Award 
 Tsuyoshi Nagabuchi – Gyakuryū (ja)
 Yellow Magic Orchestra – Solid State Survivor
 Tatsuro Yamashita – Moonglow

Lyricist Award
Also known as the Yaso Saijō Award.
 Tetsuya Takeda – "Okuru Kotoba" (ja) (singer: Kaientai)

Composer Award
Also known as the Shinpei Nakayama Award.
 Yoshinori Monta – "Dancing All Night" (ja) (singer: Monta & Brothers)

Arranger Award
 Tsugutoshi Gotō – "TOKIO" (ja) (singer: Kenji Sawada)

Special Award
 Ichimaru
 Takao Saeki
 Ichirō Fujiyama

Planning Award
 Nippon Columbia
 King Records
 EMI Music Japan

Long Seller Award
 Los Indios & Silvia – "Wakaretemo Suki na Hito" (ja)

Achievement Award
Awarded by the Japan Composer's Association
 Player Award
 Tasuku Sano (saxophonist and clarinetist)
 Kazuo Tanaka (drummer)
 Raymond Conde (clarinetist)
 Kiichi Tazawa (pianist)
 Achievement Award
 Sō Nishizawa (lyricist)

TBS Award
Awarded by the sponsoring organization.
 Kaientai

References

External links
 

1980
Japan Record Awards
Japan Record Awards
Japan Record Awards
Japan Record Awards